Corvalán is a surname. Notable people with the surname include:

Arturo Corvalán (born 1978), Chilean road racing cyclist
Carmen Silva-Corvalan, American linguist
Claudio Corvalán (born 1989), Argentine footballer
Cristóbal Saavedra Corvalán (born 1990), Chilean tennis player
Juan Rege Corvalán (1787–1830), Argentine politician and military man
Luis Corvalán (1916–2010), Chilean politician
Virginia Corvalán (1900-?), Paraguayan lawyer and feminist